Mark Sangiao (born March 25, 1979) is a Filipino martial arts coach and former professional mixed martial artist. His students include fighters such as Stephen Loman, Joshua Pacio, Eduard Folayang, Honorio Banario, Geje Eustaquio, Kevin Belingon, and Danny Kingad. Sangiao is the founder of Team Lakay in 2003.

Background
He is the founder and head coach of Team Lakay. While completing his master's degree at his alma mater, he taught at the school's Criminology Department in 2004, in addition to coaching the varsity wushu team. He began training in kickboxing in 1995 to transition to taekwondo in 1998 and made the varsity wushu squad at the Baguio Colleges Foundation, which was later renamed the University of the Cordilleras in 2003. He joined the Philippine Wushu Team in 2001, and won a gold medal at the Southeast Asia Games that same year in Kuala Lumpur, Malaysia. Today, Sangiao is known as one among the best MMA coaches in the Asia. Sangiao was also head coach of the Cordillera chapter in Baguio for Wushu, and a seasoned martial artist with past experience in kickboxing, taekwondo, and Jiu-Jitsu as well as a martial arts instructor at the Philippine Military Academy (PMA) and a coach for Wushu at the University of the Cordilleras in Baguio.

Mixed martial arts record

|-
|Loss
|align=center|7–2
|Justin Cruz
|Submission (Guillotine Choke)
|URCC 15 - Onslaught
|
|align=center|1
|align=center|3:05
|Pasay, Philippines
|
|-
|Win
|align=center|7–1
|Reysaldo Biagtan
|Submission (Armbar)
|URCC Baguio - Rumble in the Highlands
|
|align=center|1
|align=center|0:00
|Baguio, Philippines
|
|-
|Win
|align=center|6–1
|Isaac Tuling
|Decision (Unanimous)
|Fearless Fighting Championship - Intensity
|
|align=center|3
|align=center|5:00
|Pasig, Philippines
|
|-
|Loss
|align=center|5–1
|He Peng
|KO
|URCC 7 - The Art of War
|
|align=center|1
|align=center|9:18
|Quezon City, Philippines
|
|-
|Win
|align=center|5–0
|Steven Ramos
|Submission (Armbar)
|URCC 6 - Unleashed Fury
|
|align=center|1
|align=center|0:12
|Parañaque, Philippines
|
|-
|Win
|align=center|4–0
|Lino Tagacay
|Submission (Rear Naked Choke)
|URCC 5 - Beyond Fear
|
|align=center|1
|align=center|9:57
|Parañaque, Philippines
|
|-
|Win
|align=center|3–0
|Miguel Chavez
|Submission (Rear Naked Choke)
|URCC 4 - Return to the Dungeon 
|
|align=center|1
|align=center|7:58
|Parañaque, Philippines
|
|-
|Win
|align=center|2–0
|Arnel Arancina
|TKO (Referee Stoppage)
|URCC 3 - Siege at the Fort
|
|align=center|2
|align=center|1:10
|Taguig, Philippines
|
|-
|Win
|align=center|1–0
|Freddy Cepeda
|TKO (Punches)
|Fearless Fighting Championship - Relentless
|
|align=center|2
|align=center|0:00
|Pasig, Philippines
|
|}

References

1979 births
21st-century Filipino people
Living people
Filipino wushu practitioners
Filipino male mixed martial artists
Bantamweight mixed martial artists
Mixed martial artists utilizing wushu
University of the Cordilleras alumni